Hubble is a short  bolted sport climb at the limestone Raven Tor crag in Dovedale, in the Peak District in Derbyshire, England.

History
Hubble was an aid climbing practice route that used skyhooks to pass the first two bolts, which English climbers Ben Moon and Jerry Moffatt started working on in 1989. Moon rebuilt the individual moves of Hubble in his basement and practiced them with Moffatt, in particular using a new device called a "Moon Board", which was not dissimilar to Wolfgang Gullich's new campus board training device.

Moon spent eight straight days completing the first redpoint of the route, which he did on 14 June 1990, on one of the rare occasions when the route was completely dry.  Moon later said, "The year before, I had already redpointed a couple of 8c's in France. I already knew that Hubble was more difficult than all my hardest lines like Agincourt or Maginot Line. That’s why I rated it E9/7b. It was the first route in Great Britain that was given a 7b as technical difficulty". Moon also said that Moffatt had come close to redpointing it earlier, but lost interest when Moon completed it.  Hubble is widely regarded as the world's first consensus  climbing route.

First 9a
Climbers have speculated whether Hubble was actually the world's first-ever sport climb at grade , instead of Wolfgang Güllich's 1991 ascent of Action Directe, which is considered the first – and is still the "benchmark" – for the  grade.  

Czech climber Adam Ondra had a brief attempt at Hubble when conditions were not perfect (the route is usually damp) and said: "Personally, I would like to see the impressive Action Directe as the first 9a, nevertheless, when I consider it objectively, the first one is in fact Hubble, that’s a pity because it’s quite short and slimy".

The short nature of the route had led some, including Moon himself, to describe Hubble as "bouldering on a rope", and speculated that the short 4-move crux makes Hubble really a bouldering problem with a circa  bouldering grade.  Ondra himself said, "Maybe it would be more accurate to label the route as an  bouldering problem; that would make it the first 8B+ in the world – 10 years before the one that we consider to be the first today [Ondra is referring to the bouldering route, by Fred Nicole from 2000]".  

The more recent discovery of a kneebar rest at the crux is considered to have also likely softened Hubble'''s grade to a more conventional .

RouteHubble is described as starting from a big flake, after which most climbers reach for a large pinch hold. Shorter climbers can use an intermediate hold and a foothold to get the pinch. From the pinch, the climber reaches right to an  undercut, moves their feet above a lip in a high step while bringing the left hand into a two-finger pocket undercut. 

Then comes the circa  bouldering crux move, for which the climber slaps right for a slopey crimp, then to a large pinch, and then an undercut crimp. There is another high step to bring the feet above another lip and slap for a rough crimp. This is the 4-move bouldering crux section of the route, after which is a  section to finish.  

More recent ascents of Hubble (e.g Matthew Wright and Buster Martin in 2020), have seen some climbers use a kneebar short rest – a modern sport climbing technique – at the crux section that can soften the difficulty slightly, although still maintaining the route at a consensus  level.

 Ascents Hubble has been ascended by:

 1st. Ben Moon, 14 June 1990
 2nd. Malcolm Smith, 1992
 3rd. John Gaskins, 1994
 4th. Richard Simpson (disputed), 2005
 5th. Steve Dunning, 2009
 6th. Steve McClure, 2009
 7th. Alexander Megos, 31 May 2016
 8th. William Bosi, 2016
 9th. Pete Dawson, 2019
 10th. Mathew Wright, 2 October 2020 
 11th. Buster Martin, 13 October 2020
 12th. Toby Roberts, 28 October 2021

Filmography
 Sean McColl's 2014 inspection: 
 Alex Megos's 2016 ascent: 

See also
History of rock climbing
List of grade milestones in rock climbingSilence, first climb in the world with a potential grade of La Dura Dura, second climb in the world with a consensus grade of Jumbo Love, first climb in the world with a consensus grade of Realization/Biographie, first climb in the world with a consensus grade of Action Directe'', first climb in the world with a consensus grade of

References

Further reading

External links
Alex Megos Formula: Gravity (featuring Alex on Hubble, 8c+), (2016, episode 3), Red Bull

Climbing routes
1990s in sport climbing
Climbing areas of England
Mountains and hills of the Peak District
Sport climbing